(20 July 1883 in Ploiești – 14 October 1960 in Bucharest, Romania) was a Romanian architect. He was one of the influencers of Romanian architecture from the early 20th century through World War II. He will also contribute greatly to the cultural life of his country.
Among the loieștimost important designed constructions are the Cathedral of Saint John the Baptist, the Halles Centrales, the Palace of Justice, the Palace of Business Schools, the Bank of Credit  and the Scala cinema.

He moved to Bucharest, where he died in 1960.



Biography 

 marked the face of modern Romanian architecture until the Second World War, both by leaving a substantial legacy, both in terms of remarkable constructions, foundations of a cultural nature, and literature related to Romanian architecture and its evolution. It is still a benchmark in the world of architecture and art. More than a dozen of his works have been classified as historic monuments.

Education and travels 

Son, grandson and nephew of an architect, his career choice was not easy. After a happy and fulfilled childhood, his father suddenly disappeared on November 22, 1897, then his mother, three years later, the same day, he became an orphan at the age of 17 and in charge of his four brothers and sisters. Toma T. has a great talent for drawing and devotes his free time to drawing during his last three years of high school. Eager to know, he took advantage of his father's large library and inherited his drawing talent. Despite the catastrophic financial situation of the family, the dispersion of his brothers and sisters taken in by the  uncles and cousins, and the unfavorable economic situation for architects at the end of the 19th century in Romania, he succeeded in forcing destiny and following his passion for art and architecture, taking advantage of free higher education, in this time.

He finished high school in 1901 at the lyceum St Peter and St Paul of Ploiești and then enrolled at the Ion Mincu University of Architecture and Urbanism, then known as the National School of Architecture. He was a student of Ion Mincu, the leading expert in Romanian architecture at the beginning of the 20th century. In June 1911, he graduated with honors, specializing in civil and religious architecture and Romanian archaeology. He returned to this institution to teach architectural theory from 1929 to 1947.

He began his career as a designer at the Central Post Office in Bucharest in 1904. In 1906 he was hired as a designer by a large workshop of architects dedicated to building the infrastructure of the 'Romanian General Exhibition of 1906'. Carol Park was specially designed for this event by the French landscape architect . The exhibition ran from 6 June to 23 November 1906 in Bucharest. The event was organized by the Romanian Government in honor of the 40-year reign of Carol I of Romania. This opportunity put him in contact with leading artists and architects of the time and is credited with having a decisive impact on the rest of his career.

His travels to Vienna, Constantinople and Budapest in 1913, to Italy (15 December 1923 to 20 February 1924, and January 1937) and to France represented significant milestones in his life. In these places he found inspiration for his work in Romania.

World War I 
He was drafted into the 47th Infantry Regiment in 1916, where he was assigned to the Bucharest transport regiment and sent to the "Danube Defense Group". There, with other architects and engineers, he was responsible for bridge demolition operations during the Moldavia retreat. He built hospitals and sanitation facilities, hoping to combat typhus, which was wreaking havoc on the Romanian army. Around 1917 he joined a battalion of mountain troops. The retreat of the Romanian army to Moldavia gave him the chance to discover the rural and religious artistry of various Romanian regions. Clutching his notebook, he produced many drawings of folk art and traditional architectural styles that would later inspire him. Two reproductions of his watercolors of houses in Chișinău (Bessarabia) were published in 1926. In 1941 he wrote an article on the Romanian ancient art of Bessarabia, and illustrated it with his own watercolors.

Architectural and urbanistic work 
He was inspired particularly by the Brâncovenesc style. He worked to improve Ploiești's appearance and to develop public buildings for all of county of Prahova. His strong interest in archaeology led him to study and preserve many old houses and churches, and to publish essays and surveys on this subject.

He played a key role in the management of the Society of Romanian Architects, and participated in his hometown's cultural and social life. He served as Mayor from December 1919 to March 1920.

The artistic component of architecture was fundamental to him and he was very critical of architecture that was unrelated to art, especially to traditional Romanian art. He decried a sharp increase in the number of architecture students lacking the necessary artistic talent. In his memoirs, he chastised architects active from the 1920s through the 1940s, who, according to him, neglected architecture's artistic foundations. He also denounced the projects which took only land use into account and noted the lack of hygiene in houses built between 1930 and 1950, while the buildings in France, Austria and Germany of the same period were much more advanced. In his editorials, he wrote against property speculation and the immediate search for profit that led to poor construction and "soulless" buildings.

In  
He served as mayor of  immediately after World War I, as well as the county's Chief Architect. He had to handle all major supply problems in the city. He was the primary instigator of the expansion of the city's boundaries, to include the refineries located in the periphery that allowed the city to benefit from the tax base they provided. The budget tripled and reached a level that allowed large infrastructure projects. He planned major changes in the city, including the construction of the Central Market Hall of Ploiești, and acted as urban planner. Many architectural projects that were not completed during his short term were finished by the mayors that succeeded him.

This plan gave more weight to green-space, traffic and railway and generally to allow for orderly growth. The plan provides for urban development and optimal population density, allocation for public and cultural institutions, schools and green-spaces. It also details the rules that defined land-use plans. He developed similar plans for the towns of Câmpina and Mizil. These projects were enforced until the Communist takeover in 1945.

In  

He settled into the commune of Păulești in 1927. He was its mayor between February 1938 and January 1945, a term interrupted by the Legionary Movement regime between November 1940 and February 1942. His second term was shortened by the  government in January 1945. In five and a half years, he built several buildings, bridges and public monuments, including the town hall, the primary school and the public baths. He created landscaped areas for the municipal park, called  (the park with chestnut. A chestnut tree-lined avenue cut across the park and led to the cemetery. He had hoped that an amusement park and an ornamental pond could be built to provide a large relaxing green space ( is located 7 km from ). The project began around 1930, but was not completed before the Second World War. After many legal disputes between the city and the construction company, the project was halted and then re-activated in July 2007. Work resumed in 2009. In 2007, in recognition of the benefits provided by the architect, the commune college was renamed Arhitect T T. Socolescu. In May 2011, another ceremony was held in his honour, unveiling a bust in his image that was installed in the school's courtyard.

Cultural and artistic work 
To support the culture life of his city, he launched initiatives that equipped  County with its first museum and cultural institutions.

Regional Museum of  
In 1919, as County Architect in Chief, he founded a small regional ethnographic and religious art museum in that house. It was the city's first museum, initially called  or .After a public appeal and fundraising campaign, he collected art from across the county, with the help of priests and teachers. The museum was stocked with furniture, clothing and icons forgotten in the region's attics. During the period 1940–1944, the museum's inventory was eventually lost or stolen and replaced with other objects collected by Professor Nicolae Simache, assisted by Socolescu. 
Known as the  since 1953, the museum was renamed on 18 June 2005: .

Popular University  
As a political and cultural companion of Nicolae Iorga,  actively participated in Summer courses (Known from 1920 as ) that Iorga established in 1911 in Vălenii de Munte. In addition to completing the plans of the classrooms,  regularly participated as a speaker along with other professors and prominent figures from Romanian cultural and political life.  was a regular speaker, among other professors and prominent figures of Romanian cultural and political life. The renown and popularity grew to such an extent that the openings of the Summer courses attracted leading politicians and ministers. King Ferdinand of Romania, Prince Carol II of Romania and Princess Elisabeth of Wied attended Iorga's lectures. On 17 August 1938, Maria Tănase sang for the closure.

Popular Library  
Heading the Management Committee, he expanded the library collection with help from donors. In the same place, on the ground floor, he developed an art gallery by collecting Western European artists' reproductions as well as original Romanian oils and watercolors. Inaugurated on 20 March 1921, it originally held 1,250 volumes. By 1937, more than 11.000 books and more than 3,500 publications were available free of charge to its 8,000 registered readers.  donated over 250 volumes from his collection.

Museum of Fine Arts 
He founded and developed an art gallery by collecting reproductions of Western Europe artists as well as original Romanian oils and watercolors, on the ground floor of the same building. For this purpose, he was helped by a group of  intellectuals including lawyer, art collector and politician , the historian , as well as by city mayors including Ștefan Moțoiu, who provided substantial financial support. Created around 1930, within the framework of the Cultural Foundation , the pinacotheca subsequently became the Ploiești Art Museum. It was only in 1965 that the museum would be moved to the current building: the  palace, former County Prefecture. The latter was then installed in the old municipal baths.
Tomescu, but are currently on display in the museum.

Other cultural activities and foundations in  
The library was looted during the Second World War. It continues to operate and displays a work of lose friend, Romanian painter .
He organized and funded training in viticulture and fruit crops for the commune on his own farm, located at  manor.
 painted many watercolors that met some success. 

Communist period 
He refused to integrate into the Communist-sponsored organization of architects, and was considered as an enemy of the people and was persecuted by the Communist authorities. His property was nationalized in the 1950s. He was not allowed to practice as an architect and was expelled from his  estate on 21 February 1952. He moved in with his son Toma Barbu Socolescu in Bucharest. The  family was harassed by the Securitate almost until his death in 1960. Left without an income, he worked until the age of 74 at the Institute of Urban Planning and Construction (ISPROR). From 1953, within the framework of Institutul Central pentru sistematizarea orașelor și regiunilor (ICSOR) he was seconded to the Department of Historical Monuments for four years. On 12 February 1957, he was forced to retire on a reduced pension.  nevertheless continued to protest projects that he considered to be against his idea of architecture.

 published many writings. He deliberately did not claim credit for all of his works. To protect other families, his memoirs omitted some details during the communist regime. The Securitate particularly attacked wealthy families of the interwar period and seized their property and jailed many Romanians.

Legacy 
 is still studied at the Ion Mincu University of Architecture and Urbanism and is still considered as an architectural eminence in Romania.

However, since 21 October 2010 and the 50th anniversary of his death, he has come out of oblivion. Other ceremonies<ref> Articles published in the local press in 2009 and 2010:
 Initiativa Pentru Comemorarea a 50 de Ani de la Moartea Lui   newspaper of 6 July 2009.
  , 24 September 2009.
   , 13 May 2010.
  n a Fost Ales Niciun Castigat, 16 July 2010.
  , 28 September 2010.
  ', 4 October 2010.
  , 13 October 2010.
 , 20 October 2010.
 Astazi, la Ploiesti, Manifestari ample in memoria marelui arhitect Toma T. Socolescu, 21/10/2010.
 Remember -1883-1960-50 Informația Prahovei, 15 October 2010. - </ref> were held from 2009 to 2011, including the installation of a bust in front of the Central Market Hall of Ploiești and the naming of the adjacent park, for the architect.

Built by another architect with no link to the  style, it was returned to the heiress in a much damaged state. Stripped of its land, and of its ornamental garden (organized by Socolescu), it lost most of its original beauty and harmony. The estate was sold by the family in August 2010.

His  apartment house suffered badly during 1944. It was nationalized in 1950 and disfigured by a rehabilitation. It was partially returned to the family in 2006.

After 1949  devoted his spare time to his memoirs. He continued to work on the project until 1960. In 2004, after more than fifty years of neglect by various Romanian institutions, his family published the first part of his memoirs called  (the only part he had finished) which covers the period from his birth up to 1924. The Fresco of architects who have worked in Romania in the modern era from 1800 to 1925, a far more important work, was completed in 1955 and also published in 2004 by his family.

The first page of a small booklet he wrote in French in 1941 sums up his credo:

 died on October 14, 1960, in Bucharest, at the home of his son Toma Barbu Socolescu, leaving the second part of his memoirs unfinished (period after 1924). He is buried in the  family vault at Bellu Cemetery in Bucharest.

 Official duties, titles and public responsibilities 
 had a limited political commitment. His service as mayor, municipal councilor and deputy allowed him to advance cultural, urban planning or architecture projects. His links with  led him to take responsibility within the Nationalist-Democrat Party. He developed relationships and friendships with people from other political sides, such as Ion Ionescu-Quintus from the National Liberal Party.

His only national political action was his support for the bill regarding the Organization of the Corps of Architects and the Romanian Register of Architects in 1932. Adopted by parliament, a royal decree of application was signed on 15 July 1932. His official positions include:

 Professor of Theory of Architecture at the Bucharest National Higher School of Architecture (1927–1947).
 Chief Architect of the  County (1919–1920)
  County deputy under the government of Nicolae Iorga (19 April 1931 – 6 June 1932), within the Nationalist-Democrat Party.
 Vice-president of the Nationalist-Democrat Party from May 1929.
 Awarded the Order of the Cross Regina Maria for his military buildings during the first world war.
 Work award, first class for his teaching (May 1927), upon the opening of the Palace of Business Schools main body in i.
 Member of the Order of the Crown of Romania to the rank of officer by order of King Ferdinand I of Romania in 1925.
  Rotary Club member from April 1937.
 Founder and Chairman of the Cultural Foundation  in the 1930s.
 Selection Committee member of the Romanian architecture journal:  in the beginning of the 1940s.
 Member of the Society of Romanian Architects, 
 Member of the Union of Architects of the Popular Republic of Romania (1953–).

 Genealogy 
The Socol family of Berivoiul-Mare, formerly part of Făgăraș or Făgăraș land is a branch of the Socol family of Muntenia, which lived in the county of Dâmbovița. A Socol, great boyar and son-in-law of Mihai Viteazul (1557–1601), had two religious organizations in Dâmbovița county, still existing, Cornești and Răzvadu de Sus. He built their churches (and another one in the suburb of Târgoviște). This boyar married Marula, daughter of Tudora din Popești, sister of Prince Antonie-Vodă. Marula was recognized by Mihai Viteazul as his illegitimate daughter, following an extra-marital liaison with Tudora. Marula is buried in the cemetery of Răzvadu de Sus church.

Iorga found Socol ancestors among the founders of the town of Făgăraș.page 14 - Toma T. Socolescu writes around 1950:  (Translated from Romanian). Around 1846, five Socol brothers came to Muntenia from Berivoiul-Mare, in the Land of Făgăraș where the name of Socol is widespread. 
One of the brothers was architect Nicolae Gh. Socol (??-1872). He married Iona Săndulescu, from the Sfantu Spiridon suburb. He had a daughter (died in infancy) and four sons, two of whom became major architects: Toma N. and Ion N.

 Architectural contests 
 won many prizes in architectural design competitions:

 First prize for model plan for a small wooden church with one steeple and for a model plan for a bigger one with several steeples, Pantocratul, 1907.
 Second prize for the Normal School of Buzău. The first prize was not awarded because only two architects participated.
 First prize in the contest for the unification of the Palace of the newspapers Adevărul and Dimineața facades. More than 30 architects participated in the contest in 1914. The construction was never built because of the First World War. A different facade was built in the 1920s.
 First prize in the contest for the Palace of the Chamber of Commerce and Industry (in ) probably around 1920, following the acquisition of adjacent buildings by the Chamber of Commerce. The work was only partially completed. The Chamber was abolished by the Communists in 1949, after 84 years of activity. The palace was destroyed during the communist period.
 First prize in the contest of the Orthodox cathedral of the town of Târgu Mureș in 1924. The cathedral was constructed according to the design of another architect who had lost the competition.
 First prize in the contest for the Palace of the Municipality of Bucharest in 1925. It was never built.
The project was never built.
 First prize in the contest of the covered market of the town of Predeal. The project was not executed.
The project was not executed.

 Architectural achievements 
 signed his works on the rooftops by a stylized reversed lily often made of zinc or copper. The signature is visible on many of his works.

 In  
 Palace of Business Schools, at (now) 98 Gheorghe Doja street. Construction was carried out between 1924 and 1938. It hosted business schools for boys from 1938, under the name , until the communists came to power in 1948. It now houses the National College . It is classified as an historical monument.
The building is located at 8 Ștefan cel Mare street. Its construction began in 1925 and was probably completed in 1931. It was inaugurated on 2 October 1932 It was affected by the 1940 and 1977 earthquakes. Integrating the facilities for teachers and their families, it housed a theater-cinema, a bookstore and a printing press in the basement. It no longer houses the teachers. Nationalized by the Communists in 1962, it was recovered by the County League of  Free Teaching Unions in a decrepit state. It was sold several times and underwent rehabilitation from 2010 to 2013. The building must be converted into a polyclinic. It is classified as an historical monument.
 Courthouse, designed in collaboration with French architect . Implementation began before the war under the prefect Luca Elefterescu.  was nominated "executive architect" responsible for all construction from 1923 until its completion in 1932. This edifice became the Palace of Culture in 1953, while still hosting the appeal court. Weakened and damaged by the war and the earthquake of 1977, it was strengthened in the 1980s. Its restoration resumed in 2006. The palace has been classified as an historical monument.

Central Market Hall of Ploiești, is a masterpiece. The construction contract was signed in 1912, based on the municipal council decision of 9 November 1912, chaired by Mayor Scarlat Orăscu. Work began in June 1930 and was completed in 1935. Its construction is based on the principles of hygiene and logistics, and echoed across Europe.  carried out a study tour in Vienna and Budapest in the winter of 1913 before starting the project, and undertook two others during its execution. He visited Geneva, Basel, Stuttgart, Frankfurt am Main, Leipzig, Munich and Breslau. He completed his study by visiting the food floors of department stores in Berlin, the halls of Reims, Lyon and Dieppe in France, the fruit hall of Milan in Italy, and finally the halls of Budapest in Hungary. In the article he wrote for French magazine  in September 1936,  detailed his project, its objectives and its layout and operations. Partially damaged by the bombing, it was consolidated in the 1980s. The project nearly failed, due to new mayor Ion Georgescu Obrocea who in 1929 gave the project to another company, although  had had a contract since 1913.  successfully challenged this new contract, thanks to his friend lawyer Grigore Ivănceanu.pp. 71–72 The whole edifice is classified as an historical monument. On 27 February 1936,  officially introduced a construction project that was never realized.

  at the intersection of  boulevard with  street, facing what was at that time the central square of the city: . It later became the Banca Românească. The work was designed around 1923 and probably completed in 1926. Photographs and plans of the bank were published in the  journal in 1926. The building is classified as an historical monument.
 Cinematograph Scala, still visible is sited on Traian Moșoiu street. It was originally a brewery constructed on behalf of the Chamber of Commerce of  around 1933. Decommissioned and abandoned in the 2000s, the place was renovated in 2009–2010.

 St John the Baptist Cathedral (Catedrala Sfântul Ioan Botezătorul)

In 1912,  had worked on the old St John the Baptist church. According to his plans, the main dome was elevated 5 meters.

The work was carried out between 1923 and 1939. The cathedral honors the dead of the First World War and is part of a national-religious momentum. The steeple is classified as an historical monument. Only the  bell tower and the first part of the work were completed,pp. 152–153 and pp. 751–752 stopped by the war. The project for the rest of the building that would replace the existing church remained unfulfilled until work resumed in 2008, inspired by Socolescu's plans.

The facade is particularly unique to the time, and two monumental statues line the entrance. The interior's furniture is remarkable.

 In  county 
  designed the boys high school of Câmpina, at 4 Doftanei avenue. Plans were realized and approved by the Ministry of Education in 1926. Its central part as well as the wing facing Doftanei avenue were built between 1928 and 1929. The second wing, facing the Mihai Eminescu street, the Carrare marble staircase, the marble interior ornaments, the carved oak internal doors in the main hall, as well as the wrought iron ones from the outside, were carried out between 1932 and 1942. It was damaged by the earthquake of 1940 and by the bombing (the Mihai Eminescu wing and the gym were destroyed). The wing was rebuilt in 1957–1958. The 1977 earthquake left the building unusable. The building now houses the Nicolae Grigorescu National College formerly named in 1930 Liceul Dimitrie Barbu Stirbey.

 Archaeology and heritage conservation 
 had pursued a specialty in Romanian archaeology. He was interested in architectural history and preservation of architectural heritage. His projects included:

 Renovation, around 1919, of the house of the boilermaker trader Hagi Prodan, built in 1785. It is regarded as a typical residence of a  merchant in the 17th and 19th century. It is classified as an historical monument. Hagi Prodan house was the first History museum of the City of Ploiești, founded by Socolescu. After being renamed and dedicated to other purposes, the museum is now called  museum.
 Rediscovery and repair of a small and archaic ruined church in Ploeștiori or Ploieștiori in the commune of Blejoi, around 1919–1920, dating from the first half of the 18th century.  saved icons and religious art objects that he placed in the County Museum. Originally installed in the Hagi Prodan house, the Muzeul judetului no longer exists under that name. The location of these objects is unknown as of 2010. They may be in one of the museums gathered in 1955 in the Muzeul județean de Istorie și Arheologie  institution, to which the Hagi Prodan House is now attached. In 1929,  brought  there. Iorga uncovered ancient murals hidden beneath the coating. A related article was written by the historian in the Bulletin of the Historical Monuments Commission. The church, baptized Sfantu Visarion church, is classified as an historical monument. In October 2010, the ruins were abandoned and endangered. The land where they are located was sold in the 1990s by the mayor, to a private owner.
 Sfantu Pantelimon church, located at 71 Democrației street. The work was done over a period of 24 years between 1912 and 1936, due to funding constraints. Father Ene Dumitrescu was the initiator of the project. He asked  to develop the project. The earthquake of 1940 caused the collapse of the great tower. The 1977 quake damaged the walls. Two phases of reconstruction and consolidation took place in 1946 and between 1977 and 1994, including the renovation of frescos.
 Sfantu Haralambie church at 65 Mărășești street. Between 1931 and 1932,  made renovations, restorations and exterior embellishments. He radically changed the appearance of the church by rebuilding the small towers of the facade and adding a brâncovenesc style porch. It also received a reinforced concrete ceiling. The church experienced consolidations and changes after the earthquakes. In 1979 the parish priest built a great tower, which existed previously and burned in 1925. This addition was made without the approval of civil authorities.

 Reconstruction in 1937–1938 of the Ploeștiori or  church, on the outskirts of Ploiești, about the Valeni barrier, near the Vega refinery. The church has undergone several renovations. It already had a concrete structure that collapsed during the 1977 earthquake. According to the parish priest, in September 2009 a monograph on the church was written.
 Partial reconstruction of the Măgula village church in Tomșani commune between 1933 and 1938. The new church was inaugurated in November 1938. The altar and the porch of the church are classified as historical monuments.

 Other achievements 

  
 Villa of pharmacist N. Hogaș, brother of the writer Calistrat Hogaș, Gh. Lazăr street. During its construction,  reserved the ceiling of the lounge for a future fresco by Tomescu. Built around 1907, the house was destroyed during World War II. This was Socolescu's first work.
 Pasapeanu House, a small house on (now) Barbu Dela Vrancea street, built around 1908. This is his smallest work.
 House on 31 Vlad Tepes street that was made around 1908.
 House on București avenue near the South Railway Station, built around 1908. The house was destroyed by the Communists to make room for the Plants of 1 May.
 Rental property on  street, probably built about 1910, razed by Communists.
 Orăscu residential house, at 18 Independenței boulevard. Built around 1920 in the Art Nouveau fashionable French style of the time. Its interior was luxurious. The house was confiscated by the Communists, then turned into a popular canteen. It later became a polyclinic for children. The house is classified as an historical monument.

 Europa Hotel, renovation and addition of a floor in collaboration with  before 1914–1915. The hotel, first called the Victoria Hotel, was originally planned by his grandfather Nicolae Gh. Socol.p. 185 It was demolished by the Communists in 1960.

 House, built along with Ion Socolescu shortly before the First World War. It was damaged in the bombing and demolished in 1950.
 House at 12 Ștefan cel Mare street, built before the First World War, destroyed by the bombing, according to Memoirs of Socolescu. It housed the city's Technical Services in 1938. However, an ancient house remains, which matches Socolescu's style for its ground floor part. The originally one-story house, was expanded by one floor during the communist era.

 Villa on (now) C.T. Grigorescu street dates from 1913 to 1914. The villa was destroyed by the bombing. A later-built house has partially preserved the original wall and gate.
 Villa at 8 Maramureș street. Built before 1914, it was nationalized by the Communists. The house is classified as an historical monument and hosts the National Department of Highways.

  rental property at 2 Ștefan cel Mare Aurel Vlaicue street. Built from 1914, the building was habitable from 1915 and probably completed after World War I.  borrowed from banks to finance it. He installed his office and worked there until the bombing partially destroyed it. The structure was confiscated and transformed by the Soviets in the 1950s. The original facade was replaced by a more sober style. Originally the building had 7 shops on the ground floor and 5 apartments, and housed  and his family.
 Rental property in the old market ('Obor'), at 1 Émile Zola. Built in the 1920s, it was nationalized in 1950. The block of houses where it is located, escaped communist destruction.
Villa on Eminescu street. Built in the 1920s and destroyed by bombing.
 Probably built in 1922 as shown by an inscription in the lobby. It is located on Kogălniceanu street (formerly Franceză street), was published 36. Nationalized, the building was only partially recovered by the Bogdan's heirs. The house is one of the few remnants of the ancient town center of  that was razed and rebuilt in a modern style around 1980.

 Toboc building at 1 Democrației street. According to the family of the former owner and other corroborating sources,  designed and built the building. The style is reminiscent of his brâncovenesc style. The construction resembles the rental structurethat he had planned for himself a few years before, at 2 Ștefan cel Mare street. Achieved between 1920 and 1924, nicknamed Toboc (squat man), the building was nationalized in 1950. It has been occupied by tenants since the 1977 earthquake. The construction is listed as a maximum seismic risk building.

 House at 6 Rahovei road. Built around 1920, it was damaged in the bombing, but was rebuilt almost identically under Socolescu's supervision. The house was renovated in 2009 and preserves much of its original style.
House built in 1933–1934 at 4 Italiană street. It was confiscated and internally damaged during the communist period. The house is classified as an historical monument.

 Theater and cinematograph Odeon. It was built in 1927 and inaugurated on 28 February 1928. It was operating as a cinema in 1932. Renamed Rodina after its nationalization in 1948, it sheltered from 1955 the Teatrul de Stat din . It was transformed and modernized by the Communists in 1954. It was recognizable in 1957, after a long renovation during which its capacity increased to 600 seats. At an unknown later date, as a result of the 1977 earthquake, it was buried at the foot of a Soviet-style residential block. It is renamed the Toma Caragiu theater on 6 September 1991.
 Portal of the  exhibition center. Built in the 1930s, it later became the hippodrome gate. Destroyed by the bombing, the current portal is a poor copy of the original.
 Renovation of the ground floor of the  Central Bank in the 1930s. Affected by the 1977 earthquake, the bank was razed by the Communists.
 Peasant inn at the Bucov barrier, at 2 . Probably one of Socolescu's last works (1938–1939), it was planned to accommodate merchants and farmers. The market was moved to the outskirts of the town after the construction of the central hall. It was originally surrounded by horse stalls. It is a one-story building Romanian villa-style, with a large terrace in front, carved oak pillars and tiled roof. At the rear of the courtyard stood a barn for 40 animals and a smaller office building. At the time of the legionnaire regime, it became a shelter for refugees from Transylvania. Later it welcomed the nervous disease hospital of Cernăuți, evacuated following the Soviet invasion of Northern Bukovina. It then became officially the "Hospital of the Peasant Inn". Seriously affected by the bombing, the hospital was evacuated to Filipeștii de Pădure. A section for Soviet troops was opened in October 1944. In 1951, the department of nervous diseases returned. The building functioned continuously as a hospital through at least 2010.
The tomb still existed in 2009, although changed and degraded.
 According to some sources the Memorial to the heroes of World War I in the Bolovani cemetery was done by Socolescu. Partially destroyed by the bombing, it was rebuilt, but the bronze eagle that covered the top was never rebuilt.

 Prahova county 
The house was commissioned by Obrocea Ion Georgescu, then transferred to Duqué for repayment of debts, it was redesigned by the architect for Duqué.

 Town Hall, primary school, public baths, small maternity ward, stables and carved wood Trinity memorial of the  commune. The works were completed between 1937 and 1944. The stables became a bakery. The memorial was moved to the village cemetery.
 Two houses for family members of I. Diamandescu and Costică Dușescu built around 1907 in Câmpina.
 Villa of D. Ștefănescu in Câmpina. Designed in 1916 and built later, the outside appearance of the house was slightly changed. It survives at 112 Carol I boulevard. A 1916 issue of  exhibited Socolescu's plans and sketches.

 Voiculescu Pharmacy, Câmpina. It was demolished after the 1977 earthquake.
 Villa of Dr. Gheorghiu, Câmpina. The villa is unchanged, on Carol I boulevard, crossing Aleea Rozelor.

 Villa of Nicolae Popescu, Câmpina, around 1933. The villa is well preserved.
 Courthouse of Câmpina, located at 14 1 Decembrie 1918 street. The plans were drawn around 1924. In 1931 the construction was completed and the Judecatoria de Pace Mixta Campina began operations. The building still shelters the Judecatoria as well as the Prefecture offices.
Construction began in 1923. The exterior is in good shape, but as of 2010 was abandoned.
 House in  built about 1926–1927. Its original appearance changed. It is located at 12 Mihai Eminescu street.
The painter created and executed the murals. Baptised as Holy Triniy chapel, it serves as a chapel for the town cemetery.
The project was not fully realized. The villa was destroyed by the Communists.
It is classified as an historical monument. The house is at 1  street and is perfectly preserved by the family. 
It survives at 4 Piatra Arsă street.
Renovated in the 2000s, it has barely changed.

 Town Hall, public baths and agricultural center of Urlați. Construction started before 1916.

 Monument of the Trinity, in carved wood, for the town of Dumbrăvești. It no longer exists.
 Izvoarele church, built from 1931.
 Assumption's church (Adormirea Maicii Domnului) in the town of Scăeni. The roof and towers were later altered. One of the two original towers was replaced by two small ones. The original aesthetic has disappeared.
 House of engineer Toma Călinescu at 1 Monumentului street. 
House of teacher Emil Popescu at 1 Armoniei street in the Boldești-Scăeni commune.

 Bucharest 
 Rental property on Brâncoveanu street.
 Rental property at 105 Șerban Vodă avenue. The apartment house was later modernized, destroying the original design.

 Tilman brothers building. It is located at the intersection of FIilitti street and Tonitza street. This apartment house was probably built between 1923 and 1925. A piece of its upper front sprocket is no longer present. 
 
No longer in existence.
 House of Engineer Al. Gheorghiade, located in Bonaparte Park.
 Villa D. Ionescu, built in 1927 at 26 Gheorghe Brătianu (now) street. It is classified as an historical monument.

 Other counties 
 Boys High School of the railway station in Buftea (Ilfov County). It is located at 76 Mihai Eminescu boulevard. As of 2009 its name was Buftea Barbu Știrbei Economic High School.
Sfantu Nicolae și Alexandru church of Netezești, Cummune of Nuci (Ilfov county), on Principală street near the City Hall. The construction and the interior (all furniture) were probably made between 1912 and 1916. It is classified as an historical monument. 
The Netezești church was erected at the expense of Mrs. Al Serghiescu. Its interior paintings were executed under the guidance of painter Pavlu by artists Tonitza, St. Dumitrescu, Schweitzer-Cumpana and Bălțatu. Attributed works (non-exhaustive list) 
Many buildings of the period adopted Socolescu's style and signature. Some buildings have been attributed to him for which adequate documentation is not available.

 House at 120 Cantacuzino street, (crossing with Traian street), built in 1924.
 House at 17 Cantacuzino street, .

 House at 3 Constanței street, was published 3, .
 House at 7 Constanței street, was published 7, .
 Twin houses at 34 Decebal street, and on 33 Primaveri street, . They were the property of Tănase Vasilescu.

 Unbuilt works 
Many other projects were not built, including:

 Project for South-East European Institute, probably designed around 1910.
 Church project in Slănic realised during the 1913 summer and exposed at the Romanian Athenaeum of Bucharest in spring 1916.
 Church projects for Predeal (around 1956 with his son), and for the  commune (1939).
 Town hall Project for Făgăraș.

 Publications 
Some of his watercolors and drawings are included.
 In the Bulletin of the Committee on Historical Monuments (BCMI), numerous articles including:

 Sfantu Nicolae church of Bălteni, archaeological studies and topographic map. Published in 1908 in the first issue, Third quarter, under the title Architectural notes, pp. 114–119.
Published in 1916 in the final issue before the war. The article will also be published in his book . Having suffered from the bombing of 1944, the house was restored and the museum re-inaugurated on 1 May 1953.
 In  from 1916 to 1944:

 Many illustrated articles on Romanian architecture.
 Portraits of "disappeared" architects including Ion N. Socolescu, Alexandru Clavel, D. Herjeu and Toma N. Socolescu.
  (Travel notes in Italy). A 7-page illustrated article published in 1925, pp. 30-36.
 Plans and photographs of finished works, drawings and watercolors of old Romanian buildings. The issue of January–March 1941 contains an article dedicated to the old Romanian art in Bessarabia, illustrated on several pages with Socolescu's waterpaintings.
 A profession of faith entitled "Principles and improvements, Towards a Romanian modern architecture" in the April–June 1941 issue. The author ses preserving the national cultural wealth, and the Romanian national genius, while seeking progress and modernity.  rejected international architecture. The same year, he published this article in a French version.
 An article proposing an institute dedicated to promoting and developing Romanian architecture: "An institute of Romanian architecture", in the issue of 1943–1944.

 In Simetria: one article on Romanian architects who studied at the Beaux-Arts de Paris.
 In :
 Travel notes on Romania and Italy.
 Literary articles on Anna de Noailles, the Countess of Noailles (Brâncoveanu), Auguste Rodin, Octavian Goga, etc.
The ruins of the Saint Nicolas the Old church at 105 Sfantu Nicolae Vechi Mihai Bravu street)p. 149
An old house, similar to the Hagi Prodan house's style, located on 23 Ștefan cel Mare street.

 An illustrated publication .
 In the Biblioteca Urbanistă collection, two volumes of translations with introductory studies and illustrations:

 " " of Jean Raymond.
  the translation of a reference book, published in 1921 in Paris, on the subject of urban hygiene.p. 93, note 49.

 Articles about the Central Hall of :

On 21 April 1929, an article entitled "The building of the halls", about a legal dispute over the Central Market Hall construction contract.
 "L'Architecture d'Aujourd'hui", Paris, year 7, number 11, November 1936, pp. 44–45;
 "Techniques des Travaux", Paris, year 12, number 8, August 1936, pp. 413–417;  
 "La Construction moderne: Paris, year 51, number 46, September 1936, pp. 945–955
 United Kingdom: The Architect, London
 Germany: A study by Professor Ing. R. Saliger and Ing. Friedrich V. Baravalle, Vienna , Berlin, 26 May 1933, No. 14, Jahrgang, 1933, Heft 21–22

 Newspaper articles 
He was the subject of numerous articles. The following list is not exhaustive, and states when  is not the author.
   (literary journal), Bucharest, on May 22, 1916, "About the exhibition of architect T. T. Socolescu" (on the exhibition at the Romanian Athenaeum of Bucharest in spring 1916) by Spiridon Cegăneanu.
The piece includes an interview.
  , "About the need of a civic council", a political article written on March 28, 1929.
  , Bucharest, " Aedileship ... ", on May 27, 1937, by Nicolae Iorga criticizing 's inertia over addressing shacks and garbage behind the Central Market Hall.
   (literary journal), Bucharest, "Memories of Octavian Goga" an obituary on the writer, poet, journalist, playwright and politician, June 1938.
  , Bucharest, "The main roads", an article written in July 1938 on the insufficiency of the Romanian national roads.
  , Iași, "The main roads" an article about the poor quality of Romanian national roads, written on January 7, 1939.
  , Iași, "The traffic and accidents"  written on August 12, 1939. 
  , Iași, "The development of fruits", on the development of fruit production, in August 1939.
  , Bucharest, "An old Romanian house from Chișinău, a first article on the rural architectural tradition in Bessarabia written on July 22, 1940. Other articles were to follow in later issues.
   (literary journal), Bucharest,  "The need to create an institute of Romanian architecture", January 1944.
   (journal), "Restoration of ", on post-war reconstruction by Dr. Mircea Botez, that was published in No. 72 and 73 of the newspaper Presa, on November 15, 1946.
  ', Bucharest, "A final word on the issue of the Central Market", article in defense of his work and the Central Market (disparaged and criticized by Botez in Presa), 1946.

Painting and architecture exhibitions 
 Architectural projects, watercolor and church furniture in the Romanian Athenaeum of Bucharest. Painter  also exhibited oils and watercolors. Almost all the paintings were purchased.

 Exhibition of Central Market Hall project at the official Architecture Exhibition of 1930 
Architecture and Decorative Arts Exhibition of 1933

Sources 
   family's archives (Paris, Bucharest) including a photographic collection.
  , Mihail Sevastos, Editura: Cartea Ramânească, București, 1938, 1 vol., 905 pages.
  Journal , published by the SOCIETY OF ROMANIAN ARCHITECTS, Bucharest, published from 1906 to 1944
  Library of the Ion Mincu Architecture and Urbanism University.
  Central University Library of Bucharest – and particularly numerous issues of the Romanian architecture journal .
  Prahova County Department of National Archives.
  Official documents of the Romanian institutions.
  , architect in Bucharest, author of a doctoral thesis: ARHITECŢII SOCOLESCU 1840-1940 - Studiu monografic, dedicated to Socolescu architects, published at the University of Architecture and Urban Planning , 2014, 330 pages. The thesis is available at the UAIM - Summary of Gabriela Petrescu's thesis.
  Le style national roumain – Construire une nation à travers l'architecture 1881–1945, Presses Universitaires de Rennes – Simetria, Rennes, 2004, 1 vol., 375 pages,.
  Comuna  Județul Prahova – Scurtă monograph, Ing. , monograph about the  comune, Editura  Milenium III, 2005, 1 vol., 103 pages, .
  Bicericile din , I Bisericile orthodoxe, Constantin Trestioreanu, Gheorghe Marinică, Editura  Milenium III, 2003, 203 pages, .
  Monografia orașului Boldești-Scăieni, Cristian Petru Bălan, Editura Premier, 2007, 253 pages, .
  , civil and industrial engineer, construction technical expert for 35 years. Since 2004 until now, he is studying his work.
  Vincent Gérard Duqué, grandson of Gérard Joseph Duqué, . The grandfather of Mr. Duqué was a friend of the architect. Both were active members of the Rotary Club of the city.

Bibliography 
  Mihail Sevastos, Editura: Editura: Cartea Românească, București, 1938, 1 vol., 905 pages.  is one of the authors of the monograph. He wrote the chapters devoted to architecture, the Central Market Hall, urban planning, the city maps history, and culture (visual artists, museums and the "" library).
  , Prin Ardeal, note de drum ale unui arhitect, including illustrations, Editura: Cartea Românească, Biblioteca România viitoare No. 5, 1923, 32 pages, illustrations, 16 cm.
  , Romanian translation and introductory study of the French book written by Jean Raymond , under the Romanian title , Jean Raymond, R. Dautry, Biblioteca Urbanistă collection, Editura municipiului : Cartea Românească, 1927, 172 pages, illustrations, figures, tables, 19 cm.
  , Translation and introductory study of Paul Juillerat's book L'hygiène urbaine, under the Romanian title: , Paul Juillerat, Biblioteca Urbanistă collection, Editura municipiului : Cartea Românească, unknown publication date.
  , Monografie Ion Mincu, București, 408 pages, (vol. I); 69 pages: illustrations; 32 cm (vol. II), ref: II166.
  , Toma T. Socolescu arhitect român 1883-1960, Caligraf - Bucharest, 2011 and Editura Universitară „Ion Mincu”- Bucharest, 2013, 1 vol., 264 pages, 2011:  and 2013: .
  , architect in Bucharest, author of a doctoral thesis: ARHITECŢII SOCOLESCU 1840-1940 - Studiu monografic, dedicated to Socolescu architects, published at the University of Architecture and Urban Planning , 2014, 330 pages. The thesis is available at the UAIM - Summary of Gabriela Petrescu's thesis.

Notes and References 

  Mihail Sevastos, Editura: Cartea Românească, București, 1938, 905 pages.

  Society of Romanian Architects (SAR), architecture journal , published from 1906 to 1944.

 Other references:

External links 

It contains numerous photographs of the city taken between the beginning of the twentieth and 1945.
  Association for Education and Urban Development. Association whose objectives are: the preservation and enhancement of urban heritage, the organization of educational and cultural activities in the field of history, sustainable development and the protection of human rights.
  Atunci și acum Blog allows comparison, over several Romanian cities, of yesterday and today's streets views and houses.
 Historic Houses of Romania. A reference site on the finest Romanian homes, created by Valentin Mandache, Romanian architectural heritage expert. The site has also a Romanian version:  Case de Epoca.
  Three Romanian sites mainly dedicated to the history and architecture of the ancient Bucharest
 – 
 – 
 – Unknown Bucharest
  National Institute of Historical Monuments: Institutul National Al Monumentelor Istorice
 – Official list of historical monuments of Prahova county: Lista Monumentelor Istorice 2015.
 – Official list of historical monuments of Ilfov county: Lista Monumentelor Istorice 2015.
 – Official list of historical monuments of Bucharest: Lista Monumentelor Istorice 2015.
 Internet site describing all historical monuments in Romania: Asociația Prietenii MNIR.
 By the law of 21 December 2005 was established in Romania an official institution to investigate the crimes of communism. It is also allowed to refer before a court in sentencing and reparation: The Institute for the Investigation of Communist Crimes and the Memory of Romanian Exile. The destruction of the national heritage is also considered as a crime.
  Library of the Ion Mincu Architecture and Urbanism University.
  Paris, Palais de Chaillot, Database of articles and publications available - Cité de l'Architecture et du Patrimoine.
 Association ProPatrimonio for safeguarding the architectural heritage of Romania.
  Salvați Bucureștiul (Save Bucharest): an association that fights to preserve Bucharest against the frequent destruction of its historical heritage.

Members of the Chamber of Deputies (Romania)
Architects from Bucharest
20th-century Romanian architects
People from Ploiești
1883 births
1960 deaths
Art Nouveau architects